The Castello di Bifar was a castle in Campobello di Licata, Sicily. It was built in around the 11th century, and was captured by the Normans in around 1086. The castle is only known from documents such as the writings of Goffredo Malaterra.

The castle was destroyed in the 1693 Sicily earthquake, and no remains have survived today.

References

Bifar
Bifar
Buildings and structures in the Province of Agrigento
Buildings and structures completed in the 11th century
Buildings and structures demolished in the 17th century
Demolished buildings and structures in Italy